The 2021 Women's World Draughts Championship match at the international draughts was held 23 April – 3 May 2021 in Warsaw (Poland) International Draughts Federation FMJD between world champion 2019 Tamara Tansykkuzhina from (Russia) and world champion 2018 Natalia Sadowska (Poland).Tamara Tansykkuzhina won seventh title. Prize money 20 000€ (12 000€ for winner and 8 000€ for loser).

Rules
The match consists of 9 micro-matches, one per day.

The first game of the micro-matches — standard game 1 hour 20 min + 1 min per move. For victory 12 points, for loss 0 points.

If draw at 1st game — rapid game 20 min + 5 sec per move. For victory 8 points, for loss 4 points.

If draw at rapid game — blitz game 5 min + 3 sec per move. For victory 7 points, for loss 5 points.

If draw score of micro-matches, each player is awarded 6 points.

If after 9 days score is 54-54, the title is awarded to the player with the better score in standard games; if equal, the title is awarded to the player with the better score in rapid games; if equal, the deciding tie-break will be played on the day. The tie-break consists of an unlimited number of games until the first victory. The first two games will be played as a rapid game (20’+5”), from game number 3, blitz games (5’ +3”) will be played until the end.

If one of the players will get more than 54 points, the match will be finished.

Results

At score 54-54 after Round 9 was held tie-break until the victory, which won Tamara Tansykkuzhina.

Tie-break

See also
List of women's Draughts World Championship winners
Women's World Draughts Championship

References

External links
Official site
Result on site KNDB
 Результаты и комментарии на Едином шашечном сайте

2021 in draughts
Draughts world championships
2021 in Polish sport
International sports competitions hosted by Poland
Women's World Draughts
Women's World Draughts
Sports competitions in Warsaw